Quinten Peter Lynch (born 24 January 1983) is a former Australian rules footballer who played with the Collingwood Football Club and the West Coast Eagles in the Australian Football League (AFL). Originally from Grass Patch, a rural farming community near Esperance, Western Australia, he played for the West Perth Football Club in the West Australian Football League (WAFL) before being recruited to West Coast with the 19th pick overall in the 2002 Rookie Draft.

A utility player, Lynch began his career as a defender, but later switched to the forward line, leading West Coast's goalkicking in 2006 and 2007 as well as playing in the club's 2006 premiership side. He also finished second in the club's best and fairest award in 2008. Lynch quit West Coast at the end of the 2012 season, moving to Collingwood under newly implemented free agency rules. Overall, he played 209 games for West Coast.

Career

West Coast
Originally from Grass Patch, a farming community in the Goldfields-Esperance region of Western Australia, Lynch attended Aquinas College, Perth, where he was captain of the First XVIII team that won the Alcock Cup, and also rowed in the school's First VIII. He was recruited to the WAFL club West Perth, and in 2001 won selection as the All-Australian centre half-back at the under-18 carnival. He was selected by the West Coast Eagles in the 2002 Rookie Draft at Pick 19.

In 2002, he was elevated from the Rookie List after as a replacement for Phil Read, who had sustained a long-term knee injury. He was selected to represent the WAFL in a match against the QAFL, but was instead selected to play his debut match for the West Coast Eagles. He went on to play 11 games that season.

Lynch spent all of 2003 playing in the WAFL. He returned to the Eagles in 2004, playing mainly as a defender. In May, he was charged with drink-driving, reckless driving and leaving the scene of an accident, after failing to stop at a random breath test while drink driving.

He played in the forward line for almost all of the 2005 season, playing all 22 games of the regular season, and the qualifying final, but not being selected for the Preliminary and Grand Finals. During that year he kicked 31 goals, coming second on the Eagles' goal-kicking list. However, he was criticised for his tendency to drop simple chest marks.

During the 2006 pre-season, Lynch underwent mental therapy aimed at improving his marking. His form improved considerably, and he took 43 marks in the first eight rounds of the regular season. During the season he kicked four goals in one game, five in another, and a career-best eight in the Round 20 match against the Brisbane Lions. He kicked a total of 65 goals for the year, making him the first Eagle to kick over 50 goals in one season since Scott Cummings. In the 2006 finals series, he kicked more goals than any other player for that year. He was the Eagles' leading scorer in the 2006 grand final, kicking three goals in the Eagles' one-point victory.

2007 did not start well for Lynch, with his goalkicking ratio dropping under 50% at one stage. His marking, however, had improved considerably when compared to that to the two previous years. Towards the end of the season his kicking noticeably improved, kicking a 7-goal haul against Richmond in Round 20. He finished the home and away season with 48 goals, adding another four in the two finals West Coast played in. Lynch was one of eight Eagles to have played all 24 games in 2007.

The 2008 season saw a slightly different role for Lynch as the season progressed. He rarely misses games and with a large injury list and poor club performance through the season he started to play a more midfield role, with his big body around the contest and booming kick being valuable weapons. A valuable player for the Eagles due to his durability and hard work, although he did not kick as many goals in season 2008 as in previous years. Lynch played his 200th AFL game in Round 13, 2012, against his future club, .

Collingwood
At the end of the 2012 season, Lynch announced his intention to quit West Coast and become an unrestricted free agent, taking advantage of newly introduced rules allowing players over a certain games threshold to bypass the AFL's draft and trade week. He had previously been offered a one-year contract by West Coast, which he turned down. He eventually chose to sign a two-year contract with Collingwood.

Retirement
On 25 August 2014, Lynch announced that he will retire at the end of Collingwood's 2014 AFL and VFL campaigns.

Personal life
Lynch married Daneka O'Brien in December 2008 at a ceremony in Margaret River, after dating for seven years. The couple have three children. The couple took over a clothing business, O'Brien's Clothing Co., from O'Brien's parents in May 2011, and own two properties in Western Australia: a house in Waterford and a farming property near Narembeen.

Statistics

|- style="background-color: #EAEAEA"
! scope="row" style="text-align:center" | 2002
|
| 45 || 11 || 17 || 11 || 69 || 25 || 94 || 33 || 9 || 14 || 1.5 || 1.0 || 6.3 || 2.3 || 8.5 || 3.0 || 0.8 || 1.3
|-
! scope="row" style="text-align:center" | 2003
|
| 21 || 0 || — || — || — || — || — || — || — || — || — || — || — || — || — || — || — || —
|- style="background-color: #EAEAEA"
! scope="row" style="text-align:center" | 2004
|
| 21 || 22 || 6 || 2 || 173 || 80 || 253 || 72 || 30 || 9 || 0.3 || 0.1 || 7.9 || 3.6 || 11.5 || 3.3 || 1.4 || 0.4
|-
! scope="row" style="text-align:center" | 2005
|
| 21 || 23 || 31 || 22 || 168 || 49 || 217 || 91 || 22 || 48 || 1.4 || 1.0 || 7.3 || 2.1 || 9.4 || 4.0 || 1.0 || 2.1
|- style="background-color: #EAEAEA"
! scope="row" style="text-align:center" | 2006
|
| 21 || 26 || 65 || 33 || 253 || 111 || 364 || 143 || 31 || 37 || 2.5 || 1.3 || 9.7 || 4.3 || 14.0 || 5.5 || 1.2 || 1.4
|-
! scope="row" style="text-align:center" | 2007
|
| 21 || 24 || 52 || 46 || 290 || 84 || 374 || 167 || 31 || 18 || 2.2 || 1.9 || 12.1 || 3.5 || 15.6 || 7.0 || 1.3 || 0.8
|- style="background-color: #EAEAEA"
! scope="row" style="text-align:center" | 2008
|
| 21 || 22 || 23 || 20 || 280 || 124 || 404 || 143 || 42 || 49 || 1.0 || 0.9 || 12.7 || 5.6 || 18.4 || 6.5 || 1.9 || 2.2
|-
! scope="row" style="text-align:center" | 2009
|
| 21 || 22 || 18 || 24 || 279 || 156 || 435 || 127 || 39 || 147 || 0.8 || 1.1 || 12.7 || 7.1 || 19.8 || 5.8 || 1.8 || 6.7
|- style="background-color: #EAEAEA"
! scope="row" style="text-align:center" | 2010
|
| 21 || 14 || 8 || 17 || 136 || 76 || 212 || 80 || 23 || 18 || 0.6 || 1.2 || 9.7 || 5.4 || 15.1 || 5.7 || 1.6 || 1.3
|-
! scope="row" style="text-align:center" | 2011
|
| 21 || 24 || 28 || 20 || 262 || 125 || 387 || 157 || 33 || 44 || 1.2 || 0.8 || 10.9 || 5.2 || 16.1 || 6.5 || 1.4 || 1.8
|- style="background-color: #EAEAEA"
! scope="row" style="text-align:center" | 2012
|
| 21 || 21 || 33 || 20 || 189 || 74 || 263 || 113 || 33 || 24 || 1.6 || 1.0 || 9.0 || 3.5 || 12.5 || 5.4 || 1.6 || 1.1
|-
! scope="row" style="text-align:center" | 2013
|
| 21 || 18 || 9 || 10 || 149 || 109 || 258 || 99 || 20 || 129 || 0.5 || 0.6 || 8.3 || 6.1 || 14.3 || 5.5 || 1.1 || 7.2
|- style="background-color: #EAEAEA"
! scope="row" style="text-align:center" | 2014
|
| 21 || 0 || — || — || — || — || — || — || — || — || — || — || — || — || — || — || — || —
|- class="sortbottom"
! colspan=3| Career
! 227
! 290
! 225
! 2248
! 1013
! 3261
! 1225
! 309
! 537
! 1.3
! 1.0
! 9.9
! 4.5
! 14.4
! 5.4
! 1.4
! 2.4
|}

References

External links

 

1983 births
Living people
Australian people of Irish descent
Australian rules footballers from Western Australia
People educated at Aquinas College, Perth
People from Grass Patch, Western Australia
West Coast Eagles players
West Coast Eagles Premiership players
West Perth Football Club players
Collingwood Football Club players
One-time VFL/AFL Premiership players